Memories Dreams Reflections is an album by Banco de Gaia. It was released on September 22, 2009 on Disco Gecko.

Track listing
All songs written and composed by Toby Marks, except where noted.

References

2009 albums
Banco de Gaia albums
Six Degrees Records albums